John Joseph Cardinal Carberry (July 31, 1904 – June 17, 1998) was an American prelate of the Roman Catholic Church. He served as archbishop of the Archdiocese of St. Louis in Missouri from 1968 to 1979, and was created a cardinal in 1969. He previously served as bishop of the Diocese of Lafayette in Indiana from 1957 to 1965 and bishop of the Diocese of Columbus in Ohio from 1965 to 1968.

During his term as archbishop, Carberry was a strong advocate for ecumenicism and racial equality.

Biography

Early life and education
John Joseph Carberry was born in Brooklyn, New York, the youngest of ten children of James Joseph and Mary Elizabeth (née O'Keefe) Carberry. His father worked as a clerk at Kings County Court. He received his early education at the parochial school of St. Boniface Parish in Brooklyn. In 1919, at age 15, he enrolled at Cathedral College of the Immaculate Conception in Queens. He excelled in both baseball and the violin at the college.

From 1924 to 1930, Carberry studied for the priesthood in Rome, where he resided at the Pontifical North American College. He earned a Doctor of Philosophy degree (1929) and a Doctor of Theology degree (1930) from the Pontifical Urbaniana University.

Ordination and ministry
On June 28, 1929, Carberry was ordained a priest for the Diocese of Brooklyn by Cardinal Francesco Selvaggiani in Rome. Following his return to New York, Carberry was assigned as a curate at St. Peter's Parish in Glen Cove, where he remained for one year. He continued his studies at the Catholic University of America in Washington, D.C., where he received a Doctor of Canon Law degree in 1934. Carberry then served as a curate at St. Patrick's Parish in Huntington, New York, for one year.

From 1935 to 1940, Carberry was on loan to the Diocese of Trenton in New Jersey, serving as secretary to Bishop Moses E. Kiley and assistant chancellor of the diocese. He also taught at Trenton Cathedral High School  in Trenton, New Jersey, from 1939 to 1940. Returning to New York, Carberry taught at St. Dominic High School in Oyster Bay, New York, before serving as professor of canon law at Seminary of the Immaculate Conception in Huntington, New York, from 1941 to 1945.

Carberry was an officialis of the Diocese of Brooklyn from 1945 to 1956, serving as chief judge of the diocesan court. He also served as diocesan director for radio and television, becoming known as the "radio priest." Carberry was named a papal chamberlain on February 3, 1948, and raised to the rank of domestic prelate on May 7, 1954. From 1955 to 1956, Carberry served as president of the Canon Law Society of America.

Bishop of Lafayette
On May 3, 1956, Carberry was appointed coadjutor bishop of the Diocese of Lafayette and titular bishop of Elis by Pope Pius XII. He received his episcopal consecration on July 25, 1956, from Bishop Raymond Kearney, with Bishops George W. Ahr and John Benjamin Grellinger serving as co-consecrators, at the Our Lady of Perpetual Help Church In Brooklyn Carberry selected as his episcopal motto: Maria, Regina Mater (Latin: "Mary, Queen and Mother"). His installation took place at the Cathedral of St. Mary in Lafayette, Indiana, on August 22, 1956 .

Upon the death of Bishop John Bennett, Carberry automatically succeeded him as the second bishop of Lafayette on November 20, 1957. He convened the first diocesan synod and established the Diocesan Council of Men and the Society for Priestly Vocations during his tenure. Carberry attended all four sessions of the Second Vatican Council between 1962 and 1965. During its third session, he addressed the Council on Dignitatis humanae, the declaration on religious liberty.

Bishop of Columbus
Carberry was appointed the seventh bishop of the Diocese of Columbus by Pope Paul VI on January 16, 1965. He was installed at St. Joseph's Cathedral in Columbus, Ohio, on March 25, 1965. During his tenure in Columbus, he implemented the reforms of the Second Vatican Council and supported the Civil Rights Movement and ecumenical movement. He established the Clergy Advisory Council, and oversaw the renovation of St. Joseph's Cathedral after issuing regulations for liturgical changes. Carberry also bought a new building to centralize the offices of the diocesan chancery. In 1966, he was named by Cardinal Francis Spellman as vicar delegate of the Military Ordinariate for Ohio, West Virginia, Kentucky, Tennessee, Mississippi, and Alabama.

As a member of the National Conference of Catholic Bishops, Carberry served as chair of the Committee on Ecumenical and Interreligious Affairs from 1965 to 1969. He helped found the Inter-Church Board for Metropolitan Affairs, the first organization in the United States uniting Protestants and Catholics for ecumenism and social action. In January 1968, he became the first Catholic bishop to receive the Ohio Council of Churches' annual "Pastor of Pastors" award. in January 1968, Carberry received a letter from the American Jewish Congress protesting anti-Semitic language and imagery in a passion play staged each year by a parish in Union City, New Jersey.  Carberry passed these concerns to Archbishop Thomas Boland, who directed the parish to make the necessary changes.

Archbishop of St. Louis
On February 14, 1968, Carberry was appointed the fifth archbishop of the Archdiocese of St. Louis. His installation took place at the Cathedral of St. Louis in St. Louis, Missouri, on March 25, 1968. Carberry was considered more theologically conservative than his predecessor, Cardinal Joseph Ritter. Time Magazine described him as being "threatened by a world he does not understand." Carberry strongly defended Humanae vitae, and created the Archdiocesan Pro-Life Commission. Paul VI created Carberry acardinal priest of S. Giovanni Battista de Rossi a via Latina in the consistory of April 28, 1969. In 1969, Carberry removed about 60 of his seminarians from a class at the Saint Louis University Divinity School, in objection to their being taught Pauls' epistles by the Presbyterian scholar Keith Nickle.

In 1971, Carberry made a controversial decision to close McBride High school in largely black North St. Louis area, while subsidizing a swimming pool at John F. Kennedy High School in Manchester, Missouri, a wealthy suburb. Carberry moved his own residence from the episcopal residence in St. Louis to suburban Creve Coeur, Missouri. In 1972, Carberry established the Urban Services Apostolate for inner-city parishes in the archdiocese. He was elected vice-president of the National Conference of Catholic Bishops in 1974, and was a delegate to the World Synod of Bishops in 1972, 1974 and 1976. Carberry initially opposed the reception of communion by hand, believing it was irreverent and risked the possibility of recipients stealing hosts to use at black masses. However, he later permitted this practice in St. Louis in 1977. That same year, he ordained the first permanent deacons in the archdiocese.

Carberry was one of the cardinal electors who participated in the conclaves of August and October 1978, which selected Popes John Paul I and John Paul II, respectively. Carberry helped lead an internal campaign against the liberal Archbishop Jean Jadot, the apostolic delegate to the United States, whom he perceived as "destroying the Catholic Church in the United States." Carberry was a vocal critic of the television sitcom Maude, which he said "injected CBS-TV as advocate of a moral and political position that many not only oppose but find positively offensive as immoral. ...The decision to secure an abortion or the decision to have a vasectomy, even for those who choose them, is hardly a joke."

Later life and death
Upon reaching the mandatory retirement age of 75 for bishops, Carberry resigned as archbishop of St. Louis on July 31, 1979. He was succeeded by Bishop John L. May, then serving as Bishop of Mobile. After suffering a stroke in 1988, Carberry moved into St. Agnes Home in Kirkwood, Missouri, where he died at age 93. He died soon after his only living relative, sister, Loretto Carberry. He is buried in the crypt of the Cathedral of St. Louis.

References

External links
Roman Catholic Diocese of Lafayette, Indiana Official website

1904 births
1998 deaths
20th-century American cardinals
Clergy from St. Louis
American Roman Catholic clergy of Irish descent
People from Brooklyn
People from Columbus, Ohio
People from Lafayette, Indiana
Roman Catholic bishops of Lafayette in Indiana
Roman Catholic bishops of Columbus
Roman Catholic archbishops of St. Louis
Participants in the Second Vatican Council
Burials at the Cathedral Basilica of Saint Louis (St. Louis)
Cardinals created by Pope Paul VI
Pontifical Urban University alumni
Catholic University of America alumni
Catholics from New York (state)